The French Poll Tax of 1695 was established by King Louis XIV in order to finance the War of the League of Augsburg. The traditional methods of war financing had been exhausted. Vauban and Chamlay favoured taxation of the rich and privileged. Yet Pontchartrain refused to propose any measures beyond the traditional. But Basville took the initiative to a poll tax plan, and circumvented the inner circles in Paris by having it formally presented to the King by the Estates of Languedoc. As a universal tax on persons, the poll tax affected all of the three estates in all the provinces of France. Exceptions were only made for members of the mendicant orders and for the poor certified by the priest, and for those who would pay less than 2 livres in poll tax. The taxpayers were divided into twenty-two classes. Members of each class paid a fixed sum of tax. Inclusion in each class was determined not by wealth, but by rank and status. The clergy paid a lump sum of 4 million livres per year instead of being individually taxed. French historians have studied the social implications of the classifications in the schedule to the poll tax decree. Bluche and Solnon maintain that the poll tax schedule constitutes a veritable social hierarchy of France. Alain Guery rejects that the schedule to the poll tax corresponds to a social hierarchy.

Background
France had been engaged in the War of the League of Augsburg since 1688 and in 1694 no peace was in sight. To meet military expenditure, the Controller-General of Finances, Louis Phélypeaux de Pontchartrain, and his predecessor had already implemented the traditional measurers of war financing; raising the Taille and the contract of the Ferme générale, obliged the privileged estates to contribute to the treasury, created and sold countless government positions and debased the currency. But these measures did not make it possible to cover the war expenditures. In 1693, they  amounted to 180 million livres while the net revenue of the government after deducting the costs of collection only was 108 million livres. An increase in the taxes of the common people was not an option after the great famine of 1693-1694. In the inner circle around the King, thought began to be given to the creation of a new tax to which the rich and privileged would contribute. This was the basis of the poll tax of 1695.

Vauban, the Commissioner General of Fortifications, proposed in 1694 to establish a progressive tax which would affect all subjects in a position to pay it and which would be established on the basis of 1/15 of all their income. The Quartermaster-General Chamlay was well aware that France's ability to wage war depended on the government's capacity to mobilize its financial resources. Inspired by Vauban, Chamlay summarized six different solutions extending the tax base to the privileged strata of the society. The first, which was finally implemented through the poll tax of 1695, consisted in classifying individuals into categories, "taxing them according to their status, their official positions and their professions and making the heads of families pay for women, infants and servants". The second was a variant of the first, which taxed not only the head of the family, but also the other members of his household. The third proposal was easier to implement, but would bring in less money and only affect cities. It would be a question of charging a certain sum to each house, whether in the cities or in the main towns, the sum being proportional to the rents. The fourth option was to levy an annual tithe on all rentier property. But, here again, the product would be mediocre, because the bourgeois, craftsmen and merchants whose goods were in paper or silver, would be exempted from it.  If this was to be remedied, they would have to be compelled to disclose their business secrets, which would cause them harm and ruin. The fifth proposal was inspired by Holland and England, since it involved increasing taxes on beverages, foodstuffs and goods (except grain) throughout the kingdom. But this increase would be very unpopular, because it would affect the poor as much as the rich. The last way would be to charge the intendants  of each généralité to levy a tax on each city and on the nobility, taking into account the means and income of each.

Pontchartrain refused, however, to propose any measures beyond the traditional.  But the intendant Nicolas de Basville of Languedoc took the initiative to a poll tax plan, and circumvented the inner circles in Paris by having it formally presented to the King by the Estates of Languedoc. In their deliberation of December 10, 1694, they declared: “The assembly takes the liberty of proposing to His Majesty that it pleases him to make a general subsidy or poll tax which shall be borne by all his subjects. Considering that there is no more certain way to support government expenditures than this type of impost which will be fixed and certain during the course of the war, and being shared by all of His Majesty's subjects, each according to his strength, will furnish abundant relief and maintaining the honour and peace of the State without being a burden on the individuals”. Pontchartrain resisted the measure, but necessity forced him to give in when the financiers declared that they would not give any more credits unless the financial affairs of the State were in order.

Poll Tax of 1695
As a universal tax on persons, the poll tax affected all of the three estates - the clergy, the nobility and the third estate - in all the provinces of France - whether countries of estates, countries of elections states or conquered countries. No distinctions would be made between clergy and laity, noble and commoners, military and civilian, privileged and unprivileged, citizens of the free cities and burghers of the small towns, all must contribute.  Exceptions were only made for members of the mendicant orders, for the poor certified by the parish priest and for those who would pay less than 2 livres in poll tax. The taxpayers were divided into twenty-two classes. Members of each class paid a fixed sum of tax;  inclusion in each class was determined not by wealth, but by rank, quality and status. The clergy, however, were not classified on an individual basis, since they entered into a contract with the King promising to pay a lump sum of 4 million livres per year (later raised to 10 million for 1695 and 1696) instead of being subject to the poll tax. Taxpayers of the first class were to pay 2,000 livres per year, those of the second class 1,500, those of the third 1,000 and so on down to the last class whose members were assessed for one livre. No one had to pay double poll tax; persons holding several titles or offices only contribute in correspondence with the highest class he belonged to. Married sons or sons with dependents were obliged to pay the poll tax even if they lived with their parents. The tax of widows was reduced by half, and that of minors with three quarters.

The poll tax rolls were drawn up by the intendants of provinces with the aid of deputies or trustees in the countries of estates and by a certain number of gentlemen appointed by the king in the countries of elections. The intendants of provinces also handled the poll tax rolls of members of the army; the intendants of the navy and the galley corps those of these fleets. The provost of merchants and the aldermen were responsible for the rolls of the city of Paris. Nobles were, however, taxed on a separate roll. The poll tax was payable in two fixed terms, one in March, and the other in June. Collection of the poll tax was entrusted to the receivers of the ‘’Taille’’ in the rural parishes, to the receivers of common funds in cities in the countries of elections and to the provincial treasurers in the countries of estastes. In the military it was the responsibility of the paymasters. The guardians of the treasury collected the poll tax from bankers and stockbrokers.

The gross revenue for the poll tax was 21 million livres in 1695, which after deductions for miscellaneous expenses and moderations granted to provinces, cities and individuals amounted to a net income of 19 million livres. In 1696 the gross income amounted to 23 million livres, the contribution from the clergy not included. In 1697 the gross income was 24 million with the contribution of the clergy included. The total contributions for the three years may be estimated to 67 million livres.

After the Peace of Ryswick 20 September 1697 the poll tax was abolished, as of 1 April 1698.

Social implications 

French historians have studied the social implications of the classifications in the schedule to the poll tax decree.

François Bluche and Jean-François Solnon maintain that the poll tax schedule constitutes a veritable social hierarchy in France. It is a deliberate expression of the King’s efforts to reorganize the social order on service to the State; a project that began at the death of Cardinal Mazarin in 1661, when Louis XIV personal reign began. The new social hierarchy was to be founded on social class and not on the estates. In the schedule, the nobility is identified in the first three classes, but then reappears only at the head of class seven with marquises, counts, viscounts and barons. These were holders of fiefdoms of dignity, although in practice the innumerable beneficiaries of courtesy titles also were taxed. While jurists persisted in using anachronistic definitions of nobility in the spirit of Charles Loyseau, the schedule recognises that all gentlement of France, once the dukes and knights of the Order of the Holy Spirit are set aside, are equals. In this seventh class, the marquises and viscounts rub shoulders with tax collectors,  paymasters, subcontractors and principal writers. Bluche & Solon deduce that a change of status is detectable not only between the end of class six and the beginning of class seven, but also between the end of class 13 and the beginning of class 14.

Alain Guery rejects that the schedule to the poll tax forms a social hierarchy. He contends that the purpose of the schedule to the poll tax is not sociological; it doesn’t give us a straight representation of the true social hierarchy of France at this time. On the contrary, it is a picture of how the government wants to perceive and organize society. The implemented criterion of classification is proximity to the State, and to the State at war. It’s not essential that the clergy and others who cannot maintain the government in war are missing from its pages. The French are classified in relation to the State such as it is, but also as the government wants it to be. The functional tripartition of the Middle Ages is substituted by a new social order that does not completely deny the preceding world but modifies it. The schedule's double hierarchies of classes and estates are a compromise between State and society. Those whose importance the State recognizes in society as it wishes are identified with precision, the other are regrouped in categories much blurrier and vague.

Schedule
The schedule was originally issued on 18 January 1695 as part of the King's declaration. The Royal Council of Finances amended it through three addendums: 12 February 1695, 26 February 26, 1695 and 31 January 1696.

References

Citations

Cited literature
 Berger, Patrice (1976). "Pontchartrain and the Grain Trade during the Famine of 1693." The Journal of Modern History, 48 (4): 37-86. 
 Bluche, François & Solnon, Jean-François (1983). La véritable hiérarchie sociale de l'ancienne France. Le tarif de la première capitation (1695). Genève.
 Boislisle, Arthur Michel de (1874). Correspondance des contrôleurs generaux des finances. avec les intendants des provinces. Paris.
 Cénat, Jean-Philippe (2011). "La genèse et l'élaboration de la capitation de 1695." Histoire, Économie & Société, 30 3: 29-48.
 Clamageran, Jean-Jules (1876). Histoire de l'Impôt en France. Paris: Librairie de Guillaumin & Cie.
 France (1695). Declaration du Roy pour l'etablissement de la capitation, avec le tarif contenant la distribution des vingt-deux classes donné a Versailles le 18. Janvier 1695.
 France (1695a). "Supplément de Tarif pour le Réglement de Taxes de la Capitation génerale." Recueil des édits, declarations, lettres-patentes, arrêts et réglements du Roi. Rouen 1774: 536*-542*.
 France (1695b). "Second Supplément de Tarif pour le Réglement de Taxes de la Capitation génerale." Recueil des édits, declarations, lettres-patentes, arrêts et réglements du Roi. Rouen 1774: 542*-544*. 
 Guery, Alain (1986). "État, classification sociale et compromis sous Louis XIV: la capitation de 1695." Annales  41 5: 1041-1060.
 Meyer, Jean (1971). "Un problème mal posé: la noblesse pauvre. L'exemple breton au XVIIe siècle." Revue d'histoire moderne et contemporaine, XVIII, avril-juin 1971.

1695 in France
17th century in France
Taxation in France
Economic history of the Ancien Régime
Nine Years' War